Halystina is a genus of sea snails, marine gastropod mollusks in the subfamily Seguenziinae  of the family Seguenziidae.

Species
Species within the genus Halystina include:
Halystina caledonica Marshall, 1991
Halystina carinata Marshall, 1991
 † Halystina conoidea Helwerda, Wesselingh & S. T. Williams, 2014 
Halystina globulus Poppe, Tagaro & Dekker, 2006
Halystina siberutensis (Thiele, 1925)
Halystina simplex (Barnard, 1963)
Halystina umberlee Salvador, Cavallari & Simone, 2014
Halystina vaubani Marshall, 1991

References

 Marshall B.A. (1991). Mollusca Gastropoda : Seguenziidae from New Caledonia and the Loyalty Islands. In A. Crosnier & P. Bouchet (Eds) Résultats des campagnes Musorstom, vol. 7. Mémoires du Muséum National d'Histoire Naturelle, A, 150:41-109.

External links

 
Seguenziidae